The Reggae Fest is the most important reggae held in Paraguay. With an annual frequency, the festival takes place at the Rakiura Resort, located in the city of Luque, Paraguay. The first edition took place on September 27th of 2009, reaching an audience of 10000 attendees. The second edition took place on  September 26th of 2010 in the same venue reaching 9000 people of attendance.

Reggae Fest I 
Bands:
 The Wailers
 Fidel Nadal
 Matamba
 Pipa para Tabaco
 Cultura Nativa

Reggae Fest II 
Bands:
 Ese Ka’a
 Nonpalidece
 Skatalites
 Matamba
 No Te Va Gustar

See also

List of reggae festivals 
List of festivals in Paraguay

References 

Reggae festivals
Festivals in Paraguay
Central Department
Music festivals in Paraguay